This is a list of yearly Colorado Faculty Athletic Conference and Rocky Mountain Conference football standings.

Standings

Colorado Faculty Athletic Conference (1909)

Rocky Mountain Conference (1910–1966)

Rocky Mountain Athletic Conference (1967–present)

References

Rocky Mountain Athletic Conference
Standings